Paz Juana Plácida Adela Rafaela Zamudio Rivero, or more popularly known as Adela Zamudio (1854–1928) was a Bolivian poet, feminist, and educator. She is considered the most famous Bolivian poet, and is credited as founding the country's feminist movement. In her writing, she also used the pen-name Soledad.

Personal life

Adela Zamudio was born in La Paz, Bolivia, in 1854, to an upper-class family. She attended a public elementary school and was also tutored by her father, Don Adolfo Zamudio and her mother, Doña Modesta Rivero de Zamudio.

Career

As a teacher, Zamudio taught at Escuela San Alberto, and later became a director of a girls' high school, which later became known as Liceo Adela Zamudio.

Her poetry and fiction dealt primarily with the social struggles of Bolivia, often with a romantic feeling invoked towards revolution. Non-religious, her writing was highly intellectual. She published her first poem, Two Roses, when she was 15, but did not publish her first book until 20 years later.
In 1926 she was awarded the Bolivian Crown of Distinction award. Her pseudonym, Soledad (English: Solitude), was used by her to reflect her often lonely and misunderstood self, who sought to escape conservative Bolivian society. Her work, Quo Vadis, caused a stir amongst upper-class women and clerics, and animosity towards her work increased. Her struggles with religion caused her to choose to no longer teach religion at the school she directed and the League of Catholic Women publicly condemned her.

Zamudio also wrote articles for publications and newspapers, promoting democratic reforms and women's rights, including the legalization of divorce.

Legacy

Her birthday, October 11, is celebrated in Bolivia as the "Day of Bolivian Women." 
Zamudio is a featured figure on Judy Chicago's installation piece The Dinner Party, being represented as one of the 999 names on the Heritage Floor.

Works
 Essayos poéticos (Poetic Texts) (1887)
 Violeta o la princesa azul (Violeta or the Blue Princess) (1890)
 El castillo negro (The Black Castle) (1906)
 Intimas (Close Friends) (1913)
 Ráfagas (Squalls) (1914)
 Peregrinando (Travelling) (1943)
 Cuentos breves (Short Novels) (1943)

Notes

References

Chicago, Judy. The Dinner Party: From Creation to Preservation. London: Merrell (2007). 
 Bloomsbury Guide to Women's Literature

1854 births
1928 deaths
People from Cochabamba
Bolivian people of Spanish descent
Bolivian feminists
Bolivian women poets
Bolivian educators
19th-century Bolivian people
19th-century Bolivian poets
19th-century Bolivian women writers
19th-century Bolivian writers
20th-century Bolivian poets
20th-century Bolivian women writers
20th-century Bolivian writers